Ralph Joshua Dela Cruz Dionisio (born December 14, 1994 in Quezon City) is a former Filipino actor. He is best known for his role as Ken Pamintuan in Super Inggo and the young Cholo in the Philippine remake of Stairway to Heaven.

Early life
Born on December 14, 1994, in Quezon City, he has a younger brother, Jacob, his co-star on Super Inggo. Joshua Dionisio began his career as a commercial model at the age of 8. He was discovered via modeling by ABS-CBN and VIVA Films. He made his first TV appearance as the young Nicolai "Nicos" Argos in Kay Tagal Kang Hinintay.

Television career
Dionisio began his acting career in the kids television action series, Super Inggo, playing Kennedy "Ken" Pamintuan. He also appeared as Maria's childhood lover in the teleserye series Maria Flordeluna and was also one of the lead characters in Kung Fu Kids where he played Jazz—a boy with an ability to control and manipulate energy blasts through his hands.

In 2008, Dionisio won an award at the PMPC Star Awards for Television for the Best Single Performance by an Actor in the "Sako" (Sack) an episode of Maalaala Mo Kaya.

In 2009, he moved to GMA 7 via the drama series Stairway To Heaven, a Korean drama adapted for Philippine television in which he played the role of young Cholo.

He also appeared in GMA Network's primetime TV series First Time in 2010 in the role of Lukas Ynfante. He appeared in Pilyang Kerubin cast in the role of Michael on the GMA TV series and as Josh in Reel Love Presents: Tween Hearts where he is with Barbie Forteza. He has returned networks twice. In 2013, he returned to ABS-CBN. In 2016, he moved to GMA Network.

In 2015, he moved to TV5 via Wattpad Presents.

Filmography

Television

Films

Awards and nominations

References

1994 births
Living people
Filipino male child actors
Filipino male television actors
Filipino television personalities
Filipino television variety show hosts
People from Quezon City
Male actors from Metro Manila
Filipino male film actors
Star Magic
ABS-CBN personalities
GMA Network personalities